Ruslan Ivashko (born 10 November 1986) is a professional Ukrainian football forward.

Ivashko is the product of the FC Bukovyna and SC Tavriya sportive schools. His first trainer was Dmytro Hordey.

Honours
Individual
 Best Player of round 17 of Ukrainian Second League: 2020-21

References

External links

1986 births
Living people
Sportspeople from Chernivtsi
Ukrainian footballers
Association football forwards
Ukrainian Premier League players
Ukrainian expatriate footballers
Expatriate footballers in Belarus
SC Tavriya Simferopol players
FC Feniks-Illichovets Kalinine players
FC Khimik Krasnoperekopsk players
FC Mariupol players
FC Illichivets-2 Mariupol players
FC Desna Chernihiv players
FC Arsenal-Kyivshchyna Bila Tserkva players
FC Hoverla Uzhhorod players
FC Prykarpattia Ivano-Frankivsk (2004) players
FC Enerhetyk Burshtyn players
FC Poltava players
FC Nyva Ternopil players
FC Torpedo-BelAZ Zhodino players
FC Hirnyk-Sport Horishni Plavni players
FC Helios Kharkiv players
FC Isloch Minsk Raion players
FC Volyn Lutsk players
FC Epitsentr Dunaivtsi players